Ai ga Yobu Hō e (愛が呼ぶほうへ) (English: Toward Love Calls) is the thirteenth single by the Japanese Pop-rock band Porno Graffitti. It was released on November 6, 2003. The title song was appointed to the theme song of the TBS drama "Suekko Chonan Ane Sannin (末っ子長男姉三人)".

Track listing

References

2003 singles
Porno Graffitti songs